Où s'en vont les avions? is a studio album recorded by French singer Julien Clerc. It was released on 12 September 2008. A pop record, it went straight to number-one in France and Belgium (Wallonia). Maxime Le Forestier, Benjamin Biolay, Carla Bruni are among the artists who wrote some tracks for this album. The first single, "La Jupe en laine", was only available digitally.

Track listing
CD
 "La Jupe en laine" (Clerc, Duguet-Grasser) – 3:28
 "Restons amants" (Clerc, Maxime Le Forestier) – 3:33
 "Où s'en vont les avions ?" (Clerc, Duguet-Grasser) – 3:07
 "Sous sa grande ombrelle" (Benjamin Biolay, Clerc)– 2:37
 "Apprendre à lire" (Clerc, Dabadie) – 3:04
 "Une petite fée" (Clerc, Manset) – 2:00
 "Frère, elle n'en avait pas" (Clerc, Manset) – 2:47
 "Souvenez-vous" (Clerc, McNeil) – 3:02
 "Forcément" (Clerc, Duguet-Grasser) – 3:19
 "La Rue Blanche, le Petit Matin bleu" (Biolay, Clerc) – 3:20
 "Déranger les pierres" (Carla Bruni, Clerc) – 3:22
 "Dormez" (Clerc, Le Forestier) – 3:23
 "Toboggan" (Clerc, McNeil) – 3:20
 "Le Juge et la Blonde" (Clerc, Le Forestier) – 5:18

DVD - Collector edition
 "Making of de l'album" : "Où s'en vont les avions ?"

Personnel
Adapted from AllMusic.

 Michel Amsellem – piano
 Elsa Benabdallah – violone
 Denis Benarrosch – drums, percussion, programming
 Benjamin Biolay – alto, arranger, basse, celeste, clavier, composer, fender rhodes, guitar, harmonium, melodica, piano, programming, realization, string arrangements, trombone, trumpet, ukulele, violin, wurlitzer
 Dominique Blanc-francard – Basse, Mastering
 Florent Bremond – alto
 Bertrand Cervera – violone
 Julien Clerc – choeurs, clavier, piano, primary artist
 Jérôme Colliard – design
 Christophe Morin – cello
 Eric Sauviat – guitar
 Bénédicte Schmitt – engineer, mixing, programming, realization
 Laurent Vernerey – basse, contrabass

Charts

Weekly charts

Year-end charts

Certifications

Release history

References

2008 albums
Julien Clerc albums